Carolina Martuscelli Bori (January 4, 1924—October 4, 2004) was a Brazilian psychologist, specialized in experimental psychology. She was instrumental in establishing psychology undergraduate courses in Brazilian universities, as well as regularizing standards for the  profession in the country. Bori was president of the Brazilian Society for the Advancement of Science (SBPC) from 1986 to 1989.

Graduation 
Bori was born in São Paulo. She graduated in Pedagogy from the University of São Paulo (USP) in 1947. She also specialized in Educational Psychology from USP in 1948. She completed her master's degree in 1952 at the New School For Social Research (NSSR), New York, United States.  She received a doctorate in psychology from USP in 1954, supervised by Annita de Castilho and Marcondes Cabral, with the thesis Experiments on Interruption of Tasks and the Theory of Motivation by Kurt Lewin.

Works

Periodical articles 

 Bori, C. M (1953). O papel do experimentador e do sujeito na situação experimental. Boletim de Psicologia, 5, 9-17.
 Bori, C. M. (1954). Um curso de estatística aplicada à experimentação psicológica. Ciência e Cultura, 18, 19, 20, 18 – 21.
 Bori, C. M. (1956). Como o laboratório de psicologia estuda an expressão da personalidade. Boletim de Psicologia, 25, 26 e 27, 7-26.
 Bori, C. M., (1964). Aparelhos e o laboratório de psicologia. Jornal Brasileiro de Psicologia, 1(1), 61–65.
 BORI, C. M. ; ZANNON, C. M. L. C. SBP, 1972: relato do Plano Brasília por Fed S. Keller. Psicologia: Teoria e Pesquisa, São Paulo, v. 12, n.3, p. 191-192, 1996.
 BORI, C. M. ; TODOROV, J. C. ; SOUZA, D. G. Momentary maximizing in concurrent schedules with a minimum interchangeover interval. Journal of the Experimental Analysis of Behavior, Bloomington, v. 60, n.2, p. 415-435, 1993.
 BORI, C. M. . SBPC, ciência e tecnologia. Ciência e Cultura, São Paulo, v. 41, n.3, p. 211, 1989.
 BORI, C. M. ; DIAS, T. R. S. Proposta de um procedimento para identificar funções relativas de eventos quantitativamente differentes. Ciência e Cultura, São Paulo, v. 39, n.7 supl., p. 892, 1987.
 Martuscelli, C. (1950). Uma pesquisa sobre aceitação de grupos nacionais, raciais e regionais em São Paulo. Boletim CXIX, Psicologia, 3. São Paulo: Universidade de São Paulo, Faculdade de Filosofia, Ciências e Letras.
 Martuscelli, C. (1955). Desenho no estudo da personalidade: a prova de desenho da figura humana. Boletim de Psicologia, 21, 22, 23 e 24, 59–62.
 Martuscelli, C. Estudo psicológico do grupo. In: Queiroz, M. I. P., Castaldi,C., Ribeiro, E. T., Martuscelli, C. (1957) Estudos de sociologia e história. São Paulo: Ed. Anhembi, pp. 84–125.
 Martuscelli, C. (1958). Percepção e arte. Boletim de Psicologia, 35 e 36, 101.
 Martuscelli, C. (1959). Experimentos de interrupção de tarefas e a teoria de motivação de Kurt Lewin. Tese doutorado. Universidade de São Paulo, SP.

Books 

 BORI, C. M. Famílias de categorias baixa e média de status social de centros urbanos: caracterização das relações formais e informais dos membros e dos papel social dos cônjuges. São Paulo: , 1969. 158p .
 BORI, C. M. Experimentos de interrupção de tarefa e a teoria de motivação de Kurt Lewin. São Paulo: , 1959. 174p

References 

1924 births
2004 deaths
Brazilian psychologists
Brazilian women psychologists
People from São Paulo
University of São Paulo alumni
20th-century psychologists
Brazilian expatriates in the United States
The New School alumni